Punjabi TV is a Canadian Punjabi language specialty channel with select programming in the Punjabi language. It is owned by Studio 7 Production & Navalpreet Rangi and features a mix of programs, including Punjabi documentaries, news, and music. The TV channel focuses on art, prose, and poetry. Made in Punjab aims to re-introduce Canadian Punjabi to their legacy and appreciate the need to preserve their culture and faith. Punjabi TV is also available on YouTube.

References
 Official Punjabi TV Website
  Punjabi TV Canada Youtube Blog

External links
 Official Punjabi TV Website
 Punjabi TV Canada Youtube Blog

Digital cable television networks in Canada
Punjabi-language television channels